The Underwater Defence, or SAS, is the one and only EOD (Explosive Ordnance Disposal) unit of the Turkish Navy, based in the Foça Naval Base near İzmir, on the Aegean coast of Turkey

The missions of the Su Altı Savunma (SAS) include coastal defence operations, such as clearing mines or unexploded torpedoes, and disabling enemy IEDs.

History
The first S.A.S. unit was established in 1964 in the city of Istanbul, The original name of the S.A.S. unit was Su Altı Müdafaa (S.A.M.) and is bound to the Kurtarma ve Sualtı Komutanlığı (K.S.K.), or Rescue and Underwater Command.

Mission
Their main tasks are:

 Deactivation or disposal of explosive material, mines and/or unidentified ordnance under the water off the friendly ports and coasts.
 Deactivation or disposal of explosive material, mines and/or unidentified ordnance under the water off the target coasts or ports. That includes clearing of the target beaches of mines, explosives, booby traps and tank traps, prior to the amphibious assault of the friendly forces.
 Deactivation or disposal of explosives and mines that might be present on the course of the friendly troops and/or VIP military personnel.
 Consultancy in defending the strategic facilities against stealth assaults by enemy commandos.

SAS units do not perform assault, counter-terrorism, recon or CQC missions. A real-time duty executed by the SAS has been the clearing of the Girne Beach, Cyprus, prior to the amphibious assault of the Turkish Armed Forces to the island in 1974.

Equipment

Handguns
SIG P226
Glock

Submachine Guns
H&K MP5A3

Assault Rifles
M4 carbine
MPT-55

Machine Guns
FN Minimi
M60 machine gun
M134
Sniper Rifles

 Barrett M82A1
 Barrett M95
 MKEK JNG-90
 Remington XM2010
 CheyTac Intervention
 McMillan TAC-50

Anti-Materiel Rifles
Barrett M82A1
MKEK JNG-90
Rockets & Explosives
RPG7
M72 LAW
M203
M79

References

External links
Promotional/Training video of unit

See also 

 Underwater Offence (Turkish Armed Forces)
 Underwater Search and Rescue Group Command (Turkey)

Turkish Naval Forces
Explosive ordnance disposal units and formations
Armed forces diving